The Child Benefit Act 2005 (c 6) is an Act of the Parliament of the United Kingdom.

The precursor of this Act was the report "Supporting young people to achieve: towards a new deal for skills" published in March 2004 by HM Treasury, the Department for Work and Pensions and the Department for Education and Skills.

Section 1 - Persons for whom child benefit may be claimed: Great Britain
This section extends to England and Wales and Scotland.

Section 1(2) inserts section 142 of the Social Security Contributions and Benefits Act 1992.

Section 2 - Persons for whom child benefit may be claimed: Northern Ireland
This section extends to Northern Ireland.

Section 2(2) inserts section 138 of the Social Security Contributions and Benefits (Northern Ireland) Act 1992.

Section 3 - Repeals
Section 3(a) extends to England and Wales and Scotland.

Section 3(b) extends to Northern Ireland.

Schedule 1 - Consequential amendments

Part 1
This Part 1 extends to England and Wales and Scotland.

Paragraph 5 was repealed by Part 2 of Schedule 7 to the Welfare Reform Act 2009.

Paragraph 6 was repealed by Part 2 of Schedule 7 to the Pensions Act 2007.

Part 2
This Part extends to Northern Ireland.

Paragraph 31 was repealed by Part 2 of Schedule 4 to Welfare Reform Act (Northern Ireland) 2010.

Paragraph 32 was repealed by Part 2 of Schedule 6 to the Pensions Act (Northern Ireland) 2008.

Schedule 2 - Repeals
Part 1 of this Schedule extends to England and Wales and Scotland.

Part 2 of this Schedule extends to Northern Ireland.

References
Halsbury's Statutes,

External links
The Child Benefit Act 2005, as amended from the National Archives.
The Child Benefit Act 2005, as originally enacted from the National Archives.
Explanatory notes to the Child Benefit Act 2005.

United Kingdom Acts of Parliament 2005